The Celtic Explorer is a multi-purpose research vessel operated by the Marine Institute in Galway, Ireland. It came into service in 2003 for use in fisheries acoustic research, oceanographic, hydrographic and geological as well as buoy/deep water mooring and ROV Operations. The vessel is 65.5m long and has a capacity to accommodate 35 personnel of which 20-22 can be scientists. The vessel's base is the port of Galway which is located on the west coast of Ireland and offers ready access to the Atlantic Ocean.

Capabilities
 Acoustically silent (ICES 209), which minimises fish avoidance and provides an ideal environment for the collection of high quality acoustic data
 Dynamic positioning
 Retractable drop keel for acoustic transducers and other instrumentation
 EM302, EM2040 & EM1002 multi-beams (reaching depths of up to 5000m)
 Large dry and wet laboratories
 A full complement of survey equipment and winches suitable for coring, trawling and drop camera operations
 Adapted to accommodate a variety of Remotely Operated Vehicles including the Deepwater ROV Holland I
 Maximum endurance of 35 day

References

Active Marine Institute Ireland vessels
2003 ships
Research vessels